Mindwalk is a 1990 feature film directed by Bernt Amadeus Capra, adapted from his short story based on The Turning Point, a nonfiction book by his brother Fritjof Capra, author of The Tao of Physics.

The movie portrays a wide-ranging conversation among three characters: Sonia, a Norwegian physicist who abandoned a lucrative career after discovering that elements of her work were being applied to weapons development, Jack, an American politician attempting to make sense of his recent defeat as a presidential candidate, and Tom, a poet, Jack's close friend, and a disillusioned former political speechwriter, while they wander around Mont Saint-Michel, France. The movie introduces systems theory and systems thinking, along with insights into modern physical theories such as quantum mechanics and particle physics.

Political and social problems, and alternative solutions, are a focus of the film. However, the specific problems and solutions are not the primary concern; rather, different perspectives are presented through which these problems can be viewed and considered. Sonia Hoffman's perspective is referred to as the holistic, or systems theory, perspective. Thomas Harriman, the poet, recites the poem "Enigmas" by Pablo Neruda (based on the translation by Robert Bly) at the end of the movie, concluding the core discussion.

The movie was filmed on site at the Mont Saint-Michel and has views of (and scenes conceptually based around) many structures and features there, including the approach over the tidal flats, the cathedral, the walkways, a torture chamber, and a giant, ancient clock mechanism.

Cast
 Liv Ullmann as Sonia Hoffman
 Sam Waterston as Jack Edwards
 John Heard as Thomas Harriman
 Ione Skye as Kit Hoffman
 Emmanuel Montes as Romain
 Gabrielle Danchik as Tour guide
 Jeanne van Phue as Tourist 1
 Penny White as Tourist 2
 Jean Boursin as Sacristan

References

External links
 
 
 
 

1990 films
Films about philosophy
Films scored by Philip Glass
1990s English-language films
American drama films
1990s American films